is a general hospital located in Minami-ku, Yokohama, Japan. Founded in 1871, it is the second oldest western-style hospital in Japan.

History
Its predecessor was founded in 1871, and was renamed "Juzen Hospital" in 1874. In 1892, the Scottish physician and Edinburgh Medical School graduate Neil Gordon Munro became director of the hospital. Yokohama Medical College was established as an attached medical school in 1944. The medical college became Yokohama Medical School in 1947, before being merged with Yokohama City University in 1952. It was later renamed the Yokohama City University Medical Center.

Facilities and operations
Yokohama City University Medical Center is a large general hospital serving the city of Yokohama, and a teaching facility for medical professionals including residents and nurses. It has 10 disease-specific centers, 19 departments, and 726 beds.

Disease-specific centers
Advanced Critical Care and Emergency Center, General Perinatal Center, Rheumatism and Collagen Disorder Center, Inflammatory Bowel Disease (IBD) Center, Mental health Center, Cardiovascular Center, Gastrointestinal Disease Center, Respiratory Disease Center, Children's Medical Center, Reproduction Center

Departments
Comprehensive medical care, Hematology, Division of nephrology and hypertension, Endocrine/Diabetes internal medicine, Neurology, Mammary gland/Thyroid gland surgery, Orthopedics, Dermatology, Urology/Renal transplantation, Gynecology, Ophthalmology, Otolaryngology, Radiology, Dentistry/Oral surgery/Orthodontics, Anesthesiology, Neurosurgery, Rehabilitation, Plastic surgery, Diagnostic pathology.

Rankings
Yokohama City University Medical Center was ranked top in the 2012 and 2013 surveys of "The Most Reliable Hospital Ranking in Japan" conducted by the Japanese magazine The Diamond Weekly.

References

External links
  

Yokohama City University
Hospitals in Yokohama
Hospitals established in 1871
Teaching hospitals in Japan
1871 establishments in Japan